Fujiko Sawada  is a Japanese novelist. She is best-known for her works of historical fiction.

Biography 
Sawada was born in Handa, Japan on September 5. 1948. She graduated from Aichi Women's College in 1965, then moved to Kyoto in 1966. She married a journalist named Haruo Sawada in the same year, and they had a daughter, . She also learned to weave Nishijin-ori at this time.

Sawada began writing while working as a high school teacher. Her first story debuted in 1975. She began gaining attention as a writer of historical fiction with her 1978 novel . Her works rarely have happy endings, but her knowledge of Japanese arts clearly shines through.

Selected works 

 , 1978

References 

1946 births
Living people
20th-century Japanese women writers
People from Handa, Aichi